Uganda Martyrs University (UMU) is a private University affiliated with the Roman Catholic Church in Uganda. The University is owned by the Episcopal Conference of the Catholic Bishops of Uganda. It is licensed by the Uganda National Council for Higher Education. UMU consists of seven Faculties, two Institute, six Campuses, nine Departments, and three schools. As of March 2022, total student enrollment is 4,632. Of these, about 1,500 students were residential, while nearly 3,000 students were enrolled in UMU's distance learning programs. The number of staff members was over 400.

Location
The coordinates of this Campus are  0°00'13.0"N, 32°00'52.0"E (Latitude:0.003611; Longitude:32.014444).

History
UMU was established in October 1993 with 84 students and two academic departments: the Institute of Ethics & Development Studies and the Faculty of Business Administration & Management.

At the university's 24th graduation ceremony on 8 November 2018, 2040 candidates graduated with certificates, diploma, bachelors, masters and doctoral degrees. The vice chancellor informed hose present that 17 new courses had been introduced, including the Bachelor of Journalism and Bachelor of Inclusive Education, bring the total number of courses on offer to 136. A new Faculty of Engineering at the campus in Fort Portal, in Western Uganda, was also declared open.

Campuses
As of November 2018, UMU maintained campuses at the following locations:

It started in 2005 as a coordinating centre for UMU distance learning programmes but turned into a campus in 2007.
This campus houses the School of Diplomacy.
 Nsambya Campus: On the grounds of St. Francis Hospital Nsambya, on Nsambya Hill in Makindye Division in southern Kampala. This campus houses the Uganda Martyrs University School of Medicine which, in 2010, started offering the Master of Medicine degree in general surgery, obstetrics & gynecology, internal medicine, and pediatrics.
 Kabale Campus: In the south-western Ugandan city of Kabale.
 Moyo Campus: In the town of Moyo in the Northern Region, close to the border with South Sudan.
 Mbale Campus: In the city of Mbale, in the Eastern Region, at the foothills of Mount Elgon.
It houses the Faculty of Engineering.

Notable former and current faculty administrators 
David Burrell, Congregation of Holy Cross, Lecturer of Comparative Theology and Ethics
Paul D'Arbela, Fellow of the Royal College of Physicians, Dean of Postgraduate Studies at Mother Kevin Postgraduate Medical School
Patrick Edrin Kyamanywa, Vice Chancellor since 2021
John Maviiri, Vice Chancellor since 2015-2021
Charles Olweny, Vice Chancellor, 2006-2015
Prof Otaala, Laura Ariko Institute of Languages

Academic units

Faculties, schools, institutes 
Uganda Martyrs University comprises the following:  

 Faculty of Agriculture.
 Faculty of Business Administration and Management.
 Faculty of Education.
 Faculty of Health Sciences.
 Faculty of Science.
 Faculty of the Built Environment.
 Faculty of Engineering and applied Sciences.
 Institute of Ethics.
 Institute of Languages and Communication Studies.
 Mother Kevin Postgraduate Medical School 
 School of Arts and Social Sciences.
 School of Postgraduate Studies and Research.

Departments 

 Library Department

See also
 List of universities in Uganda
 Nkozi Hospital
 Nsambya Hospital
 Charles Olweny
 Education in Uganda

References

External links
 Uganda Martyrs University Official Website
 UMU Plans New Academic Courses
 UMU Is Voting Member of Association of African Universities
 Uganda’s Higher Education Chocking
 Google Maps - UMU aerial view

Uganda Martyrs University
Catholic universities and colleges in Africa
Educational institutions established in 1993
Association of African Universities
Nkozi
Mpigi District
1993 establishments in Uganda